The Suburates (also named Sibulates) were a pre-Roman tribe of the Aquitani, settled in what today is the historical territory of Soule (in Basque Xiberoa), in the Northern Basque Country. From their name come the French and Occitan name for the region, Soule, and the Basque names Xiberoa and Zuberoa. The Suburates spoke a form or dialect of the Aquitanian language, a precursor of the Basque language.

The Siburates mentioned by Julius Caesar, with the name of Sibusates in his Commentarii de Bello Gallico, which was his firsthand account of the Gallic Wars, where he narrates the expedition of Publius Licinius Crassus to Aquitaine, and also by Pliny the Elder as Sybillates. The name Subola, precedent of present-day Soule and Zuberoa, is attested for the first time in 635, when a column of a Franco-Burgundian expedition led by Duke Arnebert against the Basques was defeated by them.

See also 

Aquitani
Vascones
Soule

References 

Aquitani
Soule
Basque history